John Cale (born 9 March 1942) is a Welsh musician, composer, singer-songwriter and record producer who was a founding member of the experimental rock band The Velvet Underground in the 1960s. In the subsequent four decades, Cale has released varied solo albums, film soundtracks, and collaborations with Lou Reed, Brian Eno, Bob Neuwirth and others.

Albums

Studio albums

Soundtracks
 Paris s'eveille - suivi d'autres compositions (Crepuscule) November 1991
 23 Solo Pieces for La naissance de l'amour (Crepuscule) November 1993
 Antártida (Crepuscule) 1995
 N'oublie pas que tu vas mourir (Crepuscule) 1995
 Eat/Kiss: Music for the Films by Andy Warhol (Hannibal) June 1997
 Somewhere in the City August 1998
 Nico: Dance Music (Detour) October 1998
 Le vent de la nuit (Crepuscule) March 1999
 The Unknown (Crepuscule) 1999
 Saint Cyr (Virgin France) May 2000
 Process (Syntax) July 2005

Live 

 June 1, 1974 (with Kevin Ayers, Brian Eno, Nico) (Island) 1974
 Sabotage/Live (IRS) December 1979
 John Cale Comes Alive (Ze) September 1984
 Even Cowgirls Get the Blues (ROIR) 1991
 Fragments of a Rainy Season (Hannibal) 25 September 1992; remastered and reissued with bonus material on 16 December 2016
Le Bataclan '72 (with Lou Reed and Nico) 2004
 Circus Live (EMI) February 2007
 John Cale & Band Live (Rockpalast 1983 & 1984) DVD and vinyl (MIG) 2010

Compilations 
 Guts (Island) February 1977
 Seducing Down the Door: A Collection 1970–1990 (Rhino) 5 July 1994
 The Island Years (Island) 1996
 Close Watch: An Introduction to John Cale (Island) 20 April 1999
Inside the Dream Syndicate, Vol. I: Day of Niagara (Table of the Elements) 2000
New York in the 1960s: Sun Blindness Music (Table of the Elements) 2001
Inside the Dream Syndicate, Vol. II: Dream Interpretation (Table of the Elements) 2001
Inside the Dream Syndicate, Vol.III: Stainless Gamelan (Table of the Elements) 2001
New York in the 1960s (Table of the Elements) 2005
 Gold (Universal) 2007 (re-release of The Island Years)

EPs 

 Animal Justice (Illegal IL 003, UK) September 1977

 5 Tracks (EMI) May 2003 (reached No. 13 Budget Album chart)
 Extra Playful (Double Six/Domino Records) September 2011

Singles
Chart positions are in bold font.
 "Cleo" / "Fairweather Friend" (1970)
 "Big White Cloud" / "Gideon's Bible" (1970)
 "Days of Steam" / "Legs Larry at the Television Centre" (1972)
 "The Man Who Couldn't Afford to Orgy" / "Sylvia Said" (1974)
 "Mercenaries"* / "Rosegarden Funeral of Sores"* (1980)
 "Dead or Alive" / "Honi Soit" (1981)
 "Close Watch" / "Close Watch" (1983)
 "Close Watch" / "Changes Made" (1983)
 "Hungry for Love" / "Caribbean Sunset" (1984)
 "Ooh La La" / "Magazines" (1984)
 "Villa Albani" remixes / "Hungry for Love" (1984)
 "Dying on the Vine" / "Everytime the Dogs Bark" (1985)
 "Satellite Walk" / "Crash Course in Harmonics"* (1985)
 "Nobody But You" US ALT: 13 / "Style It Takes" / "A Dream" (1990) – with Lou Reed
 "One Word" / "Grandfather's House"* / "Palanquin"* (1990) − with Brian Eno
 "Spinning Away (Edit)" / Grandfather's House" / "Palaquin" (1990) − with Brian Eno
 "Hallelujah" (1991)
 "Paris S'eveille" (1991)
 "The Long Voyage" (1995) – with Suzanne Vega
 "Cale vs The Bees vs Doctor Rockit" (2003)
 "Things" (2003) UK: 144
 "Turn the Lights On" (2005)
 "Outta the Bag" (2006)
 "Jumbo in tha Modernworld"  (2007)
 "Big White Cloud" (2007)
 "All My Friends" (2007)
 "Whaddya Mean By That" (2011)
 "I Wanna Talk 2 U" (2012)
 "Face to the Sky" b/w "Living With You" (Organic Mix) (2012)
 "All Summer Long"* / "Sandman (Flying Dutchman)" (2013)
 "Lazy Day"* (2020)
 "Night Crawling" (2022)
*non-album song

Other appearances

Studio

Soundtrack

Productions and contributions

See also
The Velvet Underground
Theatre of Eternal Music
John Cale filmography

Notes

References

External links

Fear Is A Man's Best Friend extensive fan site
UbuWeb: John Cale featuring music from Aspen No. 5+6
John Cale Interview John Cale Interview
Essay on Cale in Examinations Archive
Fragments of Cale, track-by-track review of Cale's work
 
 
Cormac vs John Cale Album by album interview

Listening
John Cale on Studio 360 radio program

Discography
Rock music discographies
Discographies of British artists